The Essential Leonard Cohen is a career-spanning collection of Leonard Cohen songs released in 2002. It is part of Sony's The Essential series.

The songs are arranged in chronological order; all studio albums released before 2002 are represented, except the 1977 album Death of a Ladies' Man. All tracks were digitally remastered by Leonard Cohen and Bob Ludwig. All songs on the compilation were chosen by Cohen himself.

The album was re-released in August 2008 with an extra disc of previously not included tracks (presented as the selection of "fans' favorite" songs).

Track listing

Disc one
"Suzanne" – 3:48
"The Stranger Song" – 5:00
"Sisters of Mercy" – 3:34
"Hey, That's No Way to Say Goodbye" – 2:54
"So Long, Marianne" – 5:39
"Bird on the Wire" (misspelled as "Bird on a Wire" on track list) – 3:25
"The Partisan" – 3:25
"Famous Blue Raincoat" – 5:09
"Chelsea Hotel #2" – 3:06
"Take This Longing" – 4:06
"Who by Fire" – 2:34
"The Guests" – 6:40
"Hallelujah" – 4:38
"If It Be Your Will" – 3:42
"Night Comes On" – 4:40
"I'm Your Man" – 4:25
"Everybody Knows" – 5:37
"Tower of Song" – 5:37

Notes

Disc two
"Ain't No Cure for Love" – 4:49
"Take This Waltz" – 5:59
"First We Take Manhattan" – 5:50
"Dance Me to the End of Love" (live) – 6:04
"The Future" – 6:40
"Democracy" – 7:03
"Waiting for the Miracle" – 7:42
"Closing Time" – 5:57
"Anthem" – 5:59
"In My Secret Life" – 4:53
"Alexandra Leaving" – 5:22
"A Thousand Kisses Deep" – 6:26
"Love Itself" – 5:21

Notes

Disc three (The Essential 3.0 re-release)
"Seems So Long Ago, Nancy" from Songs from a Room (1969)
"Love Calls You by Your Name" from Songs of Love and Hate (1971)
"A Singer Must Die" from New Skin for the Old Ceremony (1974)
"Death of a Ladies' Man" from Death of a Ladies' Man (1977)
"The Traitor" from Recent Songs (1979)
"By the Rivers Dark" from Ten New Songs (2001)
"The Letters" from Dear Heather (2004)

Charts

Weekly charts

Year-end charts

Certifications

References

2002 greatest hits albums
Leonard Cohen compilation albums
Columbia Records compilation albums
Sony Music compilation albums
Legacy Recordings compilation albums